The Jerk is a 1979 American comedy film directed by Carl Reiner and written by Steve Martin, Carl Gottlieb, and Michael Elias (from a story by Steve Martin and Carl Gottlieb). This was Martin's first starring role in a feature film. The film also features Bernadette Peters, M. Emmet Walsh, and Jackie Mason.

Plot
Navin Johnson, a homeless person sleeping in a stairwell in Los Angeles, addresses the camera directly to tell his life story.

The white adopted son of black sharecroppers in Mississippi, Navin grows to adulthood naïvely unaware of these circumstances. He is unable to dance in rhythm to the spirited blues songs played by the family, but finds that he can do so perfectly to a champagne-style song on the radio. Seeing this moment as a calling, he excitedly decides to leave home and travel to St. Louis, from which the broadcast originated. Along the way, he adopts a dog and names it "Shithead" after angering the guests at a motel by waking them up in the middle of the night, having misinterpreted the dog's barking at his door as a warning of a fire.

Shortly after Navin begins working at a gas station, a crazed gunman chooses his name at random from the telephone book and decides to kill him. As the gunman waits for an opportunity, Navin attaches a device to a customer's eyeglasses to stop them from slipping down his nose. The customer, Stan Fox, is an inventor who promises to try to market the device and split any profits with Navin. The gunman opens fire against Navin but misses, and Navin flees to the grounds of a traveling carnival.

Navin is hired as a weight guesser and begins a sexual relationship with Patty Bernstein, an intimidating daredevil motorcyclist. He later meets a cosmetologist named Marie Kimble and arranges a date with her; when Patty tries to interrupt, Marie knocks her unconscious. The two fall in love, but Marie eventually leaves Navin because he cannot provide financial security. Devastated, Navin takes Shithead and travels to Los Angeles, where the gunman who tried to kill him - now sane and working as a private investigator - tracks him down and gives him a letter from Stan requesting a meeting.

Stan has been able to market Navin's device, now branded as the Opti-Grab, and gives him a check for $250,000 as the first installment on his share of the profits. Navin finds and marries Marie, and the two adopt a life of extravagant spending as his wealth continues to grow. Soon, though, Navin is named as defendant in a class action lawsuit brought by millions of Opti-Grab users who have become permanently cross-eyed after using the device. Navin loses the suit and is ordered to pay $10 million in damages, leaving him broke, and he storms out into the street after a heated argument with Marie. 

Having finished his story, Navin resigns himself to living in poverty, only to be found by his adoptive family, who have brought Marie and Shithead with them. The family has become wealthy by investing the money Navin sent them from time to time, and they take him and Marie home to live in their new house - which is nearly identical to their old shack, only larger. Navin dances to their blues music, having retained the perfect rhythm he gained before leaving home.

Cast

Director Carl Reiner, credited as "Carl Reiner, the Celebrity", plays himself. Former Playboy Playmate Sharon Johansen plays Mrs. Hartounian, while Alfred Dennis has a small role as Irving. In addition there are uncredited appearances by Reiner's son Rob Reiner as the truck driver who picks up Navin, character actor Larry Hankin briefly appears as a circus hand.

Production
By 1977, comedian Steve Martin was experiencing wild success. He wished to cross over to a film career, believing it promised more longevity. Basing his film proposal on a line from his act—"It wasn't always easy for me; I was born a poor black child"—he fleshed out his ideas into a series of notes he intended to deliver to studios. With confidence in his budding standup career, he imagined it would not be difficult to break into Hollywood. Instead, he found it more difficult than expected. Bill McEuen was acquainted with Paramount Pictures president David Picker, and passed along his notes, which the studio read carefully. It described a series of odd jobs lead character "Steve" would hold in his saga, but Paramount passed on the project.

Picker moved to Universal Studios around this time, and moved the film along with him. Martin was able to pick which director he wanted to work with, and chose Carl Reiner, famous for his work on The Dick Van Dyke Show.

The duo met constantly, and the film's title grew out of their conversations. Martin recounts in his memoir:It needs to be something short, yet have the feeling of an epic tale. Like Dostoyevsky's The Idiot, but not that. Like The Jerk.

Martin wrote the part of "Marie" with Bernadette Peters in mind. He adapted several bits of his standup act to fit within the film, such as a monologue in which he emotionally exits a scene, remarking "I don't need anything," but nevertheless picking up each object he passes on his way out. In co-writing the script with Carl Gottlieb and Michael Elias, their goal was to provide a laugh on each page of the screenplay.

In shooting the film, Reiner "ran a joyful set", according to Martin, with the cast and crew eating lunch together each day. Martin's favorite moment of the film, as he detailed in his 2007 memoir Born Standing Up, was the scene in which he and Peters sing "Tonight You Belong to Me". Martin felt the moment was touching, and waited in anticipation at the film's premiere screening in St. Louis. Unfortunately, much of the audience left during the scene to buy more popcorn.

Deleted scenes
A scene in which Bill Murray was to have made a cameo was cut from the final film.

An alternate, comic introduction of Marie (Peters)—near the train ride Navin was running at the carnival was shot. When her nephew takes off on the train, Navin rescues him, and in returning the boy to Marie, has the bill of his engineer's cap pulled down over his eyes so he cannot see the toy village he (Navin) destroys like a lunatic. This scene might have been edited due to a reference to Godzilla.

Another scene that was cut featured Gailard Sartain as a Texas oil millionaire who tearfully begs Navin for money to replace the cracked, dried-out leather seats on his private jet. Navin grants his request and he gratefully states, "Now I can fly my friends to the Super Bowl like a MAN, and not some damned BUM!"

The television version features a scene in which a forlorn Navin, trying to forget Marie, spends 6 hours on the Round Up carnival ride. The boss orders the ride stopped, and Navin is removed by two carnival workers, who sit him down on the ride's stairs. "What are you looking at?", he asks them. "Haven't you seen a man so broken he needed to spin?".

Reception

Box office
The film is considered to have been a box office smash for the time, earning over $73 million domestically, (making the movie the eighth highest-grossing of 1979) and $100 million worldwide, having been produced on a relatively low budget of $4 million.

Critical response
On review aggregator Rotten Tomatoes, the film has an approval rating of 83% based on 42 reviews, with an average rating of 6.9/10. The site's critical consensus reads, "Crude, crass, and oh so quotable, The Jerk is nothing short of an all-out comedic showcase for Steve Martin." On Metacritic, the film received a score of 61 based on 14 reviews, indicating "generally favorable reviews".

Janet Maslin of The New York Times wrote that The Jerk "is by turns funny, vulgar and backhandedly clever, never more so than when it aspires to absolute stupidity. And Mr. Martin, who began his career with an arrow stuck through his head, has since developed a real genius for playing dumb ... Even when it's crude—which is quite a lot of the time—it's not mean-spirited ... Mr. Martin and his co-star, Bernadette Peters, work very sweetly together, even when they sing a duet of 'Tonight You Belong to Me,' carrying sweetness to what could easily have become an intolerable extreme."

BBC film review rated the movie 2 out of 5 stars and described the film as an "early watered-down version of the crude comedy the Farrelly Brothers would later take to new extremes" and made references to it having similar themes to the early 1980s parody film Airplane!

VideoHound's Golden Movie Retriever reviewed the film for its book and rated the movie as being two and a half stars. The author of the review referred to Steve Martin's silly, exaggerated acting as complementary to the early comedian Jerry Lewis.

Legacy
The Jerk has been praised as not only one of Martin's best comedic efforts, but also one of the funniest films ever made. In 2000, readers of Total Film magazine voted The Jerk the 48th greatest comedy film of all time. This film is No. 20 on Bravo's 100 Funniest Movies and No. 89 on the American Film Institute list AFI's 100 Years...100 Laughs.  IGN ranked the film as the 10th top comedy film of all time. 
Premiere magazine voted Steve Martin's performance of Navin Johnson No. 99 on their list, "The 100 Greatest Performances of All Time". A BBC poll of more than 250 critics rated the film as the 99th greatest comedy of all time.

Christiane Kubrick hailed it as one of Stanley Kubrick's favorite films of all time.  It led to Kubrick meeting with Martin to discuss working together on his film Eyes Wide Shut.

In a 2015 interview with The Hollywood Reporter, Steve Martin was asked if the film would be accepted in this day and age with all of the "heightened racial sensitivity." His response was that he hadn't watched the movie himself in a very long time, but when he reflects on his experience with making the movie he recalls everyone being treated "with such respect" throughout the filming process.

Sequel
The Jerk had a television film sequel, The Jerk, Too (1984), starring Mark Blankfield as Navin and co-starring Stacey Nelkin. It was executive produced, but not written, by Steve Martin.

Notes

References

Sources

External links

 
 
 

1979 films
1970s adventure comedy films
1970s American films
American screwball comedy films
1970s English-language films
Films directed by Carl Reiner
Films scored by Jack Elliott
Films with screenplays by Steve Martin
Films with screenplays by Carl Gottlieb
Films about music and musicians
Universal Pictures films
1979 comedy films